Economism, sometimes spelled economicism, is a term referring to the distraction of working class political activism from a global political project to purely economic demands. The concept encompasses rewarding workers in socialism with money incentives, rather than incentivizing workers through revolutionary politics. The term is originally associated with Vladimir Lenin's critique of trade unionism.

In Marxist analysis 
The term economism was used by Lenin in his critique of the trade union movement, in reference to how working class demands for a more global political project can become supplanted by purely economic demands. Economistic demands include higher wages, shorter working hours, secure employment, health care, and other benefits. 

In his criticism of economism, Lenin's view was that the political figure of the worker could not necessarily be inferred from the worker's social position. Under capitalism, the worker's labor power is commodified and sold in exchange for wages. While negotiating the sale of labor power is necessary for survival under capitalism, Lenin argued that participating in that negotiation did not guarantee a worker's political existence and in fact obscured the underlying political stakes. 

Lenin used the term in his attacks on a trend in the early Russian Social Democratic Labour Party around the newspaper Rabochaya Mysl. Among the representatives of Russian economicism were Nikolai Lochoff, Yekektarina Kuskova, Alexander Martynov, Sergei Prokopovich, K. M. Takhtarev and others.

The charge of economism is frequently brought against revisionists by anti-revisionists when economics, instead of politics, is placed in command of society; and when primacy of the development of the productive forces is held over concerns for the nature and relations surrounding those productive forces.

Economism became a familiar term in Chinese political discourse only during the Great Proletarian Cultural Revolution (GPCR). Mao Zedong criticized the material incentives of economism, arguing that production must be led by revolutionary politics and to reward productivity with money promoted the wrong values and was inconsistent with making factories a bastion of proletarian politics.

In particular, economism became the most important issue during the Shanghai People's commune. Although many historical narratives of the GPCR have described economism as an effort on the part of the Communist Party of China leadership to bribe workers into political passivity, more recent scholarship argues that those narratives are only "partially correct, at best." Professor Yiching Wu argues, for example, that although local bureaucrats were in fact willing to make economistic concessions to workers, they had no control over the eruption of worker grievances and demands. Instead, economistic demands during this period were rooted in worker's actual conditions and driven by factors including the deterioration of work conditions during the state-driven economic accumulation of the late 1950s, the weakness of Chinese trade unions, and the collapse of the economy during the Great Leap Forward.

Other uses 
The term is often used to criticize economics as an ideology in which supply and demand are the only important factors in decisions and outstrip or permit ignoring all other factors. It is believed to be a side effect of neoclassical economics and blind faith in an "invisible hand" or laissez-faire means of making decisions, extended far beyond controlled and regulated markets and used to make political and military decisions. Conventional ethics would play no role in decisions under pure economism, except insofar as supply would be withheld, demand curtailed, by moral choices of individuals. Thus, critics of economism insist on political and other cultural dimensions in society. 

Old Right social critic Albert Jay Nock used the term more broadly, denoting a moral and social philosophy "which interprets the whole sum of human life in terms of the production, acquisition, and distribution of wealth", adding: "I have sometimes thought that here may be the rock on which Western civilization will finally shatter itself.  Economism can build a society which is rich, prosperous, powerful, even one which has a reasonably wide diffusion of material well-being. It can not build one which is lovely, one which has savor and depth, and which exercises the irresistible power of attraction that loveliness wields. Perhaps by the time economism has run its course the society it has built may be tired of itself, bored of its own hideousness, and may  despairingly consent to annihilation, aware that it is too ugly to be let live any longer."

See also 
 Class reductionism
 Economic determinism
 Gross national happiness

References

Bibliography 
 John Ralston Saul (2005). The Collapse of Globalism. 
 Richard Norgaard (2015). "The Church of Economism and Its Discontents". In Great Transition Initiative.

External links 

 May God Save Us From Economists at The New Republic

Economic ideologies
Political slurs
Political science terminology
Social theories